M. Chandran is a politician from Palakkad, Kerala, India. He was a two term MLA Member of Legislative Assembly (India) representing Alathur constituency.

Additionally, he is a Member, State Committee of Communist Party of India (Marxist) (CPI(M)).

Political life
Entered Politics while a student through K.S.F and was an active worker of K.S.Y.F . He was Taluk Secretary of K.S.F .
And was Secretary of CPI(M) District Committee, Palakkad.

References

Kerala politicians
Members of the Kerala Legislative Assembly
1946 births
Living people
People from Palakkad district
Communist Party of India (Marxist) politicians from Kerala